Out of Time is the seventh studio album by American alternative rock band R.E.M., released on March 12, 1991, by Warner Bros. Records. With Out of Time, R.E.M.'s status grew from that of a cult band to a massive international act. The record topped the album sales charts in both the United States and the United Kingdom, spending 109 weeks on U.S. album charts and enjoying two separate spells at the summit, and spending 183 weeks on the British charts and a single week at the top. The album has sold more than four and a half million copies in the United States and more than 18 million copies worldwide. The album won three Grammy Awards in 1992: one as Best Alternative Music Album, and two for the first single, "Losing My Religion."

Details
Out of Time combines elements of pop, folk and classical music heard on the band's previous album Green, with a new concentration on country elements that would continue on 1992's Automatic for the People. It features guest appearances by KRS-One and Kate Pierson from The B-52's.

Preceded by the release of "Losing My Religion," which became R.E.M.'s biggest U.S. hit, Out of Time gave them their first U.S. and UK No. 1 album. The band did not tour to support the release, although they did make occasional appearances on television or at festivals. In Germany, it is the band's best-selling album, selling more than 1,250,000 copies, reaching 5×gold. Out of Time was the first R.E.M. album to have an alternative expanded release on compact disc, including expanded liner notes and postcards. In Spain, a contest was held to have a limited edition cover with the winner being an abstract oil painting.

The album was featured in Time magazine's unranked list of The All-Time 100 Albums.

For the 25th anniversary the album was remastered. The standard version of the reissue comes with a second disc of demos, the deluxe version adds a third disc featuring live acoustic tracks. It was released through Concord Records on Nov. 18, 2016.

Packaging
Warner Brothers executive Jeff Gold, alongside Rock the Vote campaign co-founder and Virgin Records executive Jeff Ayeroff, approached R.E.M. in regards to printing a petition on the back of Out of Times CD longbox packaging in the United States where buyers were encouraged to sign their name in support for Rock the Vote, who were in support of the Motor Voter Act to ease voter registration, and would allow voters "to register through their local DMV." Gold reasoned, considering many of the album's buyers would be young, that this could "vote out" the controversial Parents Music Resource Center music censorship bill, who "put pressure on the creators and distributors of 'objectionable' music," as well as make good use of the popular longbox packaging format of the day, which many artists and customers considered unnecessary and wasteful. Michael Stipe also appeared in a public service announcement for the campaign.

In July 2014, radio show 99% Invisible said that because of this packaging, Out of Time is "the most politically significant album in the history of the United States." They said that three weeks after the album's release, "they had received 10,000 petitions, 100 per senator, and they just kept coming in droves," and a month following its release, the campaign's political director and members of KMD "wheeled a shopping cart full of the first 10,000 petitions into a senate hearing." The bill was eventually passed in 1993 by Bill Clinton and was in effect January 1, 1995; one commentary later said this happened "in no small part because of R.E.M.’s lobbying."

Reception

Mark Cooper in his review for Q Magazine, noted the difference with the previous release, Green. He highlighted Stipe's vocals and the harmony singing while describing the album as a "brooding departure [that] offers them at their most reflective, challenging and intriguing".

The 25th anniversary re-release of 

Out of Time was one of R.E.M.'s more successful albums in terms of awards and nominations. It was their only album to win a Grammy award, for Best Alternative Music Album. It also won the Q award for Best Album of 1991.

In 2000 it was voted number 49 in Colin Larkin's All Time Top 1000 Albums.

Track listing
All tracks written by Bill Berry, Peter Buck, Mike Mills and Michael Stipe.Time Side"Radio Song" – 4:15
"Losing My Religion" – 4:28
"Low" – 4:55
"Near Wild Heaven" – 3:17
"Endgame" – 3:48Memory Side"Shiny Happy People" – 3:44
"Belong" – 4:03
"Half a World Away" – 3:26
"Texarkana" – 3:36
"Country Feedback" – 4:07
"Me in Honey" – 4:06

PersonnelR.E.M.Bill Berry – drums, percussion, congas on "Low", bass guitar on "Half a World Away" and "Country Feedback", piano on "Near Wild Heaven", backing vocals on "Near Wild Heaven", "Belong", and "Country Feedback", production
Peter Buck – electric guitar, acoustic guitar, mandolin on "Losing My Religion" and "Half a World Away", production
Mike Mills – bass guitar; backing vocals, organ on "Radio Song", "Low", "Shiny Happy People", "Half a World Away", and "Country Feedback", piano on "Belong", harpsichord on "Half a World Away"; percussion on "Half a World Away", lead vocals on "Near Wild Heaven" and "Texarkana", keyboards and arrangement on "Losing My Religion" and "Texarkana"; production
Michael Stipe – lead vocals (except "Near Wild Heaven" and "Texarkana"), melodica and arrangement on "Endgame", backing vocals on "Near Wild Heaven" and "Texarkana", production, packaging, photographyAdditional musiciansDavid Arenz – violin on "Radio Song", "Low", "Near Wild Heaven", "Endgame", "Shiny Happy People", "Half a World Away" and "Texarkana"
Ellie Arenz – violin on "Radio Song", "Low", "Near Wild Heaven", "Endgame", "Shiny Happy People", "Half a World Away" and "Texarkana"
Mark Bingham – string arrangements on "Radio Song", "Losing My Religion", "Low", "Near Wild Heaven", "Endgame", "Shiny Happy People", "Half a World Away" and "Texarkana"
David Braitberg – violin on "Radio Song", "Low", "Near Wild Heaven", "Endgame", "Shiny Happy People", "Half a World Away" and "Texarkana"
Andrew Cox – cello on "Radio Song", "Low", "Near Wild Heaven", "Endgame", "Shiny Happy People", "Half a World Away" and "Texarkana"
Reid Harris – viola on "Radio Song", "Low", "Near Wild Heaven", "Endgame", "Shiny Happy People", "Half a World Away" and "Texarkana"
Peter Holsapple – bass guitar on "Radio Song" and "Low", acoustic guitar on "Losing My Religion", "Shiny Happy People" and "Texarkana", electric guitar on "Belong"
Ralph Jones – double bass on "Radio Song", "Low", "Near Wild Heaven", "Endgame", "Shiny Happy People", "Half a World Away" and "Texarkana"
Kidd Jordan – baritone saxophone on "Radio Song" and "Near Wild Heaven", tenor saxophone on "Radio Song" and "Endgame", alto saxophone on "Radio Song", bass clarinet on "Low" and "Endgame"
John Keane – pedal steel guitar on "Texarkana" and "Country Feedback"
Dave Kempers – violin on "Radio Song", "Low", "Near Wild Heaven", "Endgame", "Shiny Happy People", "Half a World Away" and "Texarkana"
KRS-One – rapping on "Radio Song"
Scott Litt – echo-loop feed on "Radio Song"
Elizabeth Murphy – cello on "Radio Song", "Low", "Near Wild Heaven", "Endgame", "Shiny Happy People", "Half a World Away", and "Texarkana"
Paul Murphy – viola on "Radio Song", "Low", "Near Wild Heaven", "Endgame", "Shiny Happy People", "Half a World Away", and "Texarkana"
Kate Pierson – backing vocals on "Near Wild Heaven", and duet on "Shiny Happy People", "Me in Honey"
Jay Weigel – orchestral liaison on "Radio Song", "Low", "Near Wild Heaven", "Endgame", "Shiny Happy People", "Half a World Away", and "Texarkana"
Cecil Welch – flugelhorn on "Endgame"ProductionDave Friedlander – engineering
Tom Garneau – engineering
Ben Katchor – illustrations
John Keane – engineering
Scott Litt – production, engineering
Ted Malia – engineering
Stephen Marcussen – mastering, at Precision Mastering, Los Angeles, California, United States
Frank Ockenfels – photography
Tom Recchion – packaging
Mike Reiter – engineering
Ed Rogers – illustrations
Karina Santo – photography
Doug Starn – photography
Mike Starn – photography

Charts

Weekly charts

Year-end charts

Certifications and sales

Release history
In 2005, Warner Bros. Records issued an expanded two-disc edition of Out of Time which includes a CD, a DVD-Audio disc containing a 5.1-channel surround sound mix of the album done by Elliot Scheiner, lyrics, a photo album, and the original CD booklet with expanded liner notes. In 2011 Warner Bros. released a 96 kHz, 24-bit and 192 kHz, 24 bit stereo release (the same High-Resolution stereo mix as featured on the DVD-Audio and later, the Blu-Ray editions) of the album at HDtracks.Out of TimeNote† Edition packaged with a bonus 7" single—"World Leader Pretend"/"Turn You Inside Out" from TourfilmBox sets'''

See also
List of best-selling albums in Germany

References

Bibliography
 Black, Johnny. Reveal: The Story of R.E.M.'' Backbeat Books, 2004.

External links
 R.E.M.HQ on Out of Time
 
  (DualDisc edition)
 

1991 albums
Albums produced by Bill Berry
Albums produced by Michael Stipe
Albums produced by Mike Mills
Albums produced by Peter Buck
Albums produced by Scott Litt
Grammy Award for Best Alternative Music Album
R.E.M. albums
Warner Records albums